Willie Marais (10 August 1928 – 26 December 2007) was an Afrikaner nationalist and the leader of the far-right South African political party, the Herstigte Nasionale Party, from 2001 until his death. In 1969, when he was MP for Wonderboom, he resigned from the National Party in sympathy with the expelled Albert Hertzog.

He died on 26 December 2007 from a heart attack while on holiday.

References

External links 
"Meet the HNP" (Afrikaans)

1928 births
2007 deaths
Afrikaner nationalists
Apartheid in South Africa
Herstigte Nasionale Party politicians